Nasr-Dubai Pro Cycling Team, formerly known as Al Nasr Pro Cycling Team – Dubai, was a men's UCI Continental cycling team, based in Dubai, United Arab Emirates. The team competed in the UCI Asia Tour. The team was developed from the club level with the intention of "developing local talent, to produce top Emirati cyclists", as Yousif Mirza said. However the team disbanded after the 2016 season.

2016 roster

Major wins

2016
Stage 3 Tour de Chlef, Adil Barbari
Memorial Manuel Sanroma, Jesus Alberto Rubio
Circuit International d'Alger, Jesus Alberto Rubio
 Overall Tour d'Oranie, Luca Wackermann
Stage 1, Tomas Vaitkus
Stages 2 & 3, Luca Wackermann
Grand Prix de la Ville d'Oran, Tomas Vaitkus
 Overall Tour International de Blida, Luca Wackermann
Stages 1 & 3, Luca Wackermann
Stage 2, Adil Barbari
 Overall Tour International de Sétif, Essaïd Abelouache
Stages 1 & 4, Tomas Vaitkus
Stage 2, Essaïd Abelouache
Stage 3, Adil Barbari
Critérium International de Sétif, Adil Barbari
 Overall Tour Internationale d'Annaba, Luca Wackermann
Stages 1 & 3, Adil Barbari
Stage 2, Luca Wackermann
Stage 4, Essaïd Abelouache
Overall Tour International de Constantine, Tomas Vaitkus
Stages 1 & 3, Adil Barbari
Stage 2, Jesus Alberto Rubio
 National Road Race Championships, Yousif Mirza
 National Time Trial Championships, Yousif Mirza
Stage 4 Tour d'Azerbaïdjan, Luca Wackermann

National champions
2016
 UAE Road Race, Yousif Mirza
 UAE Time Trial, Yousif Mirza

References 

Cycling teams based in the United Arab Emirates
UCI Continental Teams (Asia)
Cycling teams established in 2016
2016 establishments in the United Arab Emirates
Cycling teams disestablished in 2016
Defunct cycling teams
2016 disestablishments in the United Arab Emirates